Leucoagaricus leucothites, the white dapperling, or white Agaricus mushroom, is a species of agaric fungus. The species was originally described as Agaricus leucothites by Carlo Vittadini in 1835, and bears similarity to species of that genus. Solomon Wasser transferred it to Leucoagaricus in 1977. While sometimes regarded as edible, the species is suspected of being poisonous due to gastric-upset-causing toxins. It could also be confused with the deadly Amanita ocreata.

The mushroom's cap is 4 to 15 cm wide, is granular, white or gray-brown in color then sometimes grayish or pinkish. The flesh may bruise yellowish and the gills reddish. The stipe is 5 to 12 cm long, commonly with a wide base, and bruising yellow or brown. A ring is usually present. The spores are white, smooth, and elliptical.

It generally appears in civilized areas such as gardens and parks, but sometimes is found in forests.

See also
List of Leucoagaricus species

References

External links
 Mushroom Poisoning: Destroying Angel vs. what's called a Lookalike that many Experts Avoid Eating

leucothites
Fungi of Europe
Fungi of North America
Fungi described in 1835